SkyBus is an airport bus service operating in Australia in Melbourne, Hobart, Brisbane and in Auckland, New Zealand.

In Melbourne, SkyBus carries over 2 million passengers per year and 8.3% of all Melbourne Airport passengers.

History
SkyBus commenced operations on 6 June 1978, running a shuttle service between Melbourne Airport and the Melbourne city centre. On 2 August 1982, SkyBus took over the airport bus services run by the now-defunct airlines Ansett and TAA.

Until November 2000, the Melbourne city centre terminus was at a coach depot in Franklin Street. It would pick up passengers at the then Spencer Street station and various city hotels before continuing on to the airport. In November 2000, SkyBus relocated to Spencer Street station with services operating express to the airport, cutting the journey time to 20 minutes and allowing more services to be introduced. Connecting minibuses were introduced to continue the hotel transfer/pickup service.

In 2002, the Government of Victoria opted to contribute $3 million to a $10 million plan to expand and improve SkyBus services, after a feasibility study into a city to airport rail link found the service would not be viable. The initiative funded the purchase of new buses, and improvements to the Tullamarine Freeway, to give SkyBus vehicles priority in traffic. The operation has an audited revenue share arrangement with the Victorian Government.

In August 2008, the SkyBus contract was renewed for five years. In 2007 SkyBus' patronage grew by 17% over the previous year, to 1.6 million passengers, with estimated revenue of $24 million.

Proposals to improve the bus service involving turning emergency lanes into bus lanes on the freeway and the Bolte Bridge and putting SkyBus on a Myki fare, were challenged by CityLink operator Transurban, because it would limit its toll revenue, and by Melbourne Airport, because it would reduce its car parking profits. Both facilities were privatised in the 1990s.

In September 2014, SkyBus was purchased by a consortium that included Catalyst Direct Capital Management and OPTrust Private Markets Group. The consortium would later be known as |AATS Group (known as Kinetic Group since August 2019). In 2015, SkyBus purchased the Auckland Airport service in New Zealand from Johnston's Coachlines. In June 2016, SkyBus commenced operating to Frankston with the purchase of the Frankston & Peninsula Airport Shuttle.

In February 2017, SkyBus took over the route between Southern Cross station and Avalon Airport previously run by Sita Buslines. In July 2017, it began operating the Geelong to Avalon Airport service after the previous owners, Murrel Group, lost their accreditation to enter the airport. In November 2017, SkyBus Gold Coast operations commenced in Gold Coast, Queensland with the purchase of the Gold Coast Tourist Shuttle (GCTS) business from Surfside Buslines.

Services in Australia

Melbourne & Geelong

Melbourne City Express
SkyBus's flagship service operates between Melbourne Airport in Tullamarine and Southern Cross railway station on the western edge of the Melbourne city centre, via the Tullamarine Freeway and CityLink, with no intermediate stops. At Melbourne Airport, SkyBus stops for pick up and drop off at Terminals 1 and 3, and also picks up at Terminal 4. Terminals 2 and 4 are within walking distance from the Terminal 3 stop.

The service operates 24 hours a day, 365 days a year, to a 10-minute frequency between 6:00 am and 12:00 am (midnight), subject to traffic conditions. The service operates to a 30-minute frequency between 1:00 am and 4:30 am, and 15 to 30 minutes at all other times.

SkyBus is not covered under the Myki ticketing system which services the rest of Melbourne. but SkyBus  allows the use of the access travel pass on all SkyBus services in Victoria only.
 Proposals in January 2013 by the Victorian Government to integrate SkyBus ticketing with the Myki system were shelved after opposition from Transurban and Melbourne Airport.

Avalon City Express
The Avalon City Express service operates between Avalon Airport and Southern Cross railway station via the Princes Freeway and West Gate Freeway, making a stop in Werribee. The service operates to a timetable that is adjusted monthly, with one service connecting to every flight departing and arriving at Avalon Airport.

Peninsula Express
The Frankston shuttle operates between Terminal 4 of Melbourne Airport and Frankston railway station, making intermediate stops in St Kilda, Elsternwick, Elwood, Brighton, Moorabbin, Highett, Cheltenham, Parkdale and Chelsea. A limited number of services extend to Mount Eliza and Mornington, while one weekday-only service continues further to Dromana and Rosebud.

St Kilda Express

The St Kilda Express service operates between Terminal 4 of Melbourne Airport and four designated stops in St Kilda, picking up and setting down passengers at these stops. Outbound passengers can also be picked up at Terminal 1.
The service operates daily, including all public holidays, to a 30-minute frequency on weekdays and hourly on weekends. Operating hours are approximately between 6:30 am and 7:00 pm daily.

This service is currently unavailable.

Western Express
The Western Express operates between Terminal 4 of Melbourne Airport and Werribee, with an intermediate stop at Tarneit railway station. Outbound passengers can also be picked up at Terminal 1.
The service operates daily, including all public holidays. Operating hours are approximately between 5:05 am and 8:35 pm daily.

This service is currently unavailable.

Eastern Express
The Eastern Express operates between Terminal 4 of Melbourne Airport and Croydon railway station, making intermediate stops at Watsonia railway station, Doncaster Shopping Centre, Box Hill Central, Blackburn railway station and Ringwood railway station. Outbound passengers can also be picked up at Terminal 1.
The service operates daily, including all public holidays. Operating hours are approximately between 4:30 am and 7:15 pm daily.

This service is currently unavailable.

Avalon Geelong Express
The Avalon Geelong Express service operates between Avalon Airport and South Geelong railway station, with an intermediate stop at Geelong railway station. The service began in July 2017. The service operates to a timetable that is adjusted monthly, with one service connecting to every flight departing and arriving at Avalon Airport.

This service is currently unavailable.

Southbank Docklands Express
The Southbank Docklands Express operates between Terminal 4 of Melbourne Airport and four designated stops in Southbank, with an intermediate stop in Docklands. The service began in November 2017, operating to similar frequencies and hours as the St Kilda Express. Fares are identical to that of the Melbourne City Express service.

This service is currently unavailable.

Gold Coast Airport Services
In December 2017, SkyBus launched airport shuttle services to the Gold Coast Airport from various hotels. From 16 September 2018, the Byron Bay Express commenced running services from Gold Coast Airport to Byron Bay.

This service is currently unavailable.

Hobart Express
In July 2018, SkyBus started services between Hobart CBD and Hobart Airport.

Services in New Zealand

SkyBus operated services to Auckland Airport, but they have been suspended because of the COVID-19 pandemic in New Zealand.

The Auckland City Express operated between the airport and the SkyBus Lounge in the Auckland CBD, running via the Southwestern Motorway, either Dominion Road or Mount Eden Road, and Queen Street.

The North Harbour Express service operated between the airport and Albany (referred to by SkyBus as Albany Westfield because of the nearby Westfield Albany shopping mall). Services ran along the Northern Busway on the North Shore section of the route, stopping at Smales Farm and Akoranga stations.

Fleet
As at June 2022, the combined fleets consisted of 104 vehicles.

References

External links

Australian website
New Zealand website

Bus companies of Queensland
Bus companies of Victoria (Australia)
Bus transport in Melbourne
Public transport in Auckland
Public transport on the Gold Coast, Queensland
Transport companies established in 1978
1978 establishments in Australia
Kinetic Group companies